The Government Museum (Shivappa Nayaka Palace) named after the popular 17th-century king Shivappa Nayaka of the Keladi Nayaka dynasty is located in Shivamogga city (formerly known as Shimoga), the district headquarters of the Shivamogga district in the Karnataka state, India. 

Though named after the Nayaka king, according to art historian George Michell, the palatial bungalow was actually built by the 18th century Mysore ruler Hyder Ali. The building is a protected monument under the Karnataka state division of the Archaeological Survey of India.

The two storied building comprises a Durbar hall ("nobel court") with massive wooden pillars and lobed arched panels. The living chambers on the sides are at the upper level and have balconies and look down into the hall. 

Numerous antiquities collected from near by temples and archeological sites, such as sculptures, inscriptions and hero stones from the Hoysala era and later periods are on display at the palace grounds.

Gallery

The Building

12th century Hindu Sculptures

Jain Sculptures

Hero Stones

References

External links

Museums in Karnataka
Palaces in Karnataka
Shimoga
Buildings and structures in Shimoga district
State museums in India
Nayakas of Keladi
Museums with year of establishment missing